The Leeds municipal elections were held 9 May 1957, with one third of the council up for election, alongside extra vacancies in the City, Halton and Woodhouse wards.

Much like the national picture, with Labour winning record representation on borough councils, Labour outstripped their prior efforts, defending all of their 1954 gains as well as gaining in Beeston and Harehills – two wards they failed to win in their peak of 1952, despite accruing only a modest swing of 1.2% swing (although they had come within a vote to taking the former the previous year). Unlike 1952 or the year before, Labour failed to gain Wortley this time, as the Liberal damage to the Conservative vote was unwound. The two gains increased Labour's majority to 28, mirroring the Conservatives' after their triumphant 1951 election. Turnout rose to 36.2% following last year's plummet to the low thirties.

Election result

The result had the following consequences for the total number of seats on the council after the elections:

Ward results

References

Leeds City Council election
1957
City Council election], 1957
Leeds City Council election